The Pink Palace, also known as the Mrs. Marshall Field House and the Inter-American Defense Board, is a historic house located in the Adams Morgan neighborhood in Washington, D.C. It has been listed on the National Register of Historic Places since 1991. George Oakley Totten Jr. was the architect for the structure that was completed in 1906. Additions were made to the house in 1912 and 1988.

References

Houses completed in 1906
Houses on the National Register of Historic Places in Washington, D.C.
Adams Morgan
1906 establishments in Washington, D.C.